Palisadoes (word apparently of Portuguese origin) is the thin tombolo of sand that serves as a natural protection for Kingston Harbour, Jamaica. Norman Manley International Airport and the historic town of Port Royal are both on Palisadoes.

The privateer Henry Morgan was buried in Palisadoes cemetery, which sank beneath the sea after the 1692 earthquake.

References

Headlands of Jamaica
Ramsar sites in Jamaica
Kingston, Jamaica
Tombolos